UCBLogo, also termed Berkeley Logo, is a programming language, a dialect of Logo, which derived from Lisp. It is a dialect of Logo intended to being a “minimum Logo standard.” It has the best facilities for handling lists, files, input/output (I/O), and recursion. It can be used to teach most computer science concepts, as University of California, Berkeley lecturer Brian Harvey did in his Computer Science Logo Style trilogy. It is free and open-source software released under a GNU General Public License (GPL).

Graphical user interface
UCBLogo has a rudimentary graphical user interface (GUI), so several projects exist that provide a better interface. MSWLogo and its successor FMSLogo, for Microsoft Windows, are commonly used in schools in the United Kingdom and Australia.

Design
Logo was designed in spirit of low threshold and no ceiling, which enables easy entry by novices and yet meet the needs of high-powered users. Animations require both the ability to draw and to erase shapes. The process is the same, except that in the former, a line is deposited on the display device and in the latter a line is removed. Using the turtle analogy, the turtle's pen must paint, and the turtle's pen must erase. The turtle can be set to erase anything below it, using the command PENERASE (PE), while the pen can be set to start drawing again with the command PENPAINT (PPT), in UCBLogo.

The pen

The analogy of a turtle with a pen attached to its tail is often used. The turtle's pen can be lifted and lowered, thus drawing a rudimentary dotted line.

An example code:
 FD 20 ; draw a line and move
 PENUP ; lift the pen so it draws nothing
 FD 20 ; move and not draw
 PENDOWN ; lower the pen so it draws again
 FD 20 ; draw a line and move
 PENUP ; lift the pen so it draws nothing
 FD 40 ; move and not draw
 PENDOWN ; lower the pen so it draws again
 RT 20 ; rotate right (clockwise) 20 degrees

Data
There are three datatypes in UCBLogo:
 the word
 the list
 the array

A number is a special case of word.

There is no static typing. The interpreter detects the datatype by context.

Two important symbols are:
 The colon means the contents of. This is an extremely useful symbol that keeps reminding students that a variable is really a place in memory.
 The doublequote (") means the word is evaluated as itself, or its value after evaluation is the same as it was before. This is important. For users from other programming languages: the doublequote is not paired as opening and closing quotes.

A number is a special case of self-evaluation; it really could be written with a quote. 2 is really "2

Variable assignment (e.g. x := y + 3) is handled in Logo with the make command, as exemplified by these two equivalent statements:
 make "x sum :y 3
 make "x sum :y "3

make takes 2 parameters, the second of which here is sum :y "3. sum takes two 'parameters' and is an 'operation', thus the calculation is possible."3 evaluates to 3, and :y takes the contents of the thing called y, these are summed giving a number.

The effect of make is to place the result into the first parameter. From a programmatical perspective, the first argument to make is passed by reference, while the second is passed by value.

Scoping
Variables do not have to be declared before use; their scope is then global.

A variable may be declared local, then its scope is limited to that procedure and any procedures that it calls, which is termed dynamic scope. Calling a procedure with inputs (the name usually used for arguments in the Logo literature) also creates local variables that hold the argument values.

Lists
Logo inherits lists from Lisp, and they are its main method to store vectors. Arrays are also provided.
 Operators exist to convert words into lists, and lists into arrays and back again.
 This data type has the advantage over arrays that it is infinitely expandable. Data are extracted using the operations first, butfirst, last, butlast, butmember, member, and item. Data elements are added using sentence, fput, and lput.
 A list can be considered to be a queue with the operators queue and dequeue, or a stack with the operations push and pop.
 Recursion rather than iteration is the natural method to process lists.

Control structure commands
Logo provides several common control structures.
There is one conditional structure.
 ifelse test [ do_if_true list ] [do_if_false list]

There are three iteration commands:
 while condition [instruction list]
 until condition [instruction list ]
 repeat number [instruction list]

Recursion is Logo's preferred processing paradigm.

Template iteration
Logo also provides list-based control structures. The basic idea is of two lists:

 OPERATION [ a list of commands ] [ many data items ]

each of the commands is applied in turn to each of the data items. There are several of these template commands with names like MAP, APPLY, FILTER, FOREACH, REDUCE and CASCADE. They represent four flavours of template iteration, known as explicit-slot, named-procedure, named-slot (or Lambda), and procedure-text.

Property lists
A property list is a special list where the odd number items are property names, and the even are property values. There are three commands to process property list.
 pprop :listname :name :value ;to add a new pair to the list
 remprop :listname :name :value ;to remove a pair from the list
 show gprop :listname :name  ;to get the matching value from the list

Input, output
For input/output (I/O), text may be written to the command window (output stream) using print and to the graphics window using label

The standard commands are readlist readword readchar with the normal input stream being the keyboard. In Unix tradition the input stream can be changed, so input can come from a disk file. Similarly, output can be redirected.

Syntax
Commands may be written on one line, or more. Many commands have mnemonic short forms; for example FORWARD and RIGHT are coded FD and RT respectively. This makes the input less onerous.
 ; draws a square with sides 100 units long
 FORWARD 100
 LEFT 90
 FORWARD 100
 LEFT 90
 FORWARD 100
 LEFT 90
 FORWARD 100
 LEFT 90

 FD 100 RT 120 FD 100 RT 120 ; draws a triangle
 FD 100 RT 120

The Hello World program in Logo looks like this:

 print [Hello World]

Loops
There are three loop (repeat) commands;  is one. This draws a square.

 REPEAT 4 [FD 100 LEFT 90]

The command FD 100 LEFT 90 is executed four times.
An approximation of a circle can be constructed easily with 360 small rotations and a step forward: . Loops may be nested, giving results with little effort.

 REPEAT 36 [RT 10 REPEAT 360 [FD 1 RT 1]]
 FD 25
 RT 90

Another example for nested Loops

 REPEAT 36 [REPEAT 4 [FD 100 RT 90] RT 10]

Functions and procedures
Each line is made up of function calls, of which there are two types:
 commands (which usually do something—effects—but do not return a value) like print.
 operations (which just return a value, its output) like sum, first or readlist.

A command is similar to a Pascal procedure, and an operation is similar to a Pascal function. (See also: command-query separation, where a query is an operation in Logo). A special subset of operations, called predicates, which just output the word true or false, are conventionally written with a final p. Examples include emptyp, wordp, and listp.
 Expressions can be primitives, or can be defined by the user.
 Expressions can take zero, one or more parameters.

Procedures can be defined on the command line, using the  TO  END  pair:

 TO CHAIR  
 REPEAT 4 [FD 100 RT 90]  FD 200  
 END

However, in some early Logos the procedure is limited to the physical line length of the input device.

All Logos can invoke an Editor, usually by EDALL. In the editor, procedures may be written over many lines, as nothing is interpreted until the edit is complete.

 EDALL

 TO CHAIR
 REPEAT 4 [FD 100 RT 90]  FD 200
 END

The new word is saved into the available vocabulary, but the definition will be lost once the Logo session is over.  Internally procedures are words and in this case, any time CHAIR is entered, the sequence REPEAT 4 [FD 100 LEFT 90] FD 200 will be executed. The word CHAIR can be used as a command; for example, REPEAT 4 [CHAIR] would repeat the CHAIR operation four times.

 EDALL ;(to enter the editor mode, then the actual procedure)

 TO ERASECHAIR
 PE
 BK 200 REPEAT 4 [FD 100 RT 90]
 PPT
 END

 CS CHAIR WAIT 200 ERASECHAIR

A WAIT delay between the drawing and the erasing can introduce the illusion of motion:
 CS REPEAT 20 [CHAIR WAIT 200 ERASECHAIR PENUP FD 20 PENDOWN]

Arguments, parameters
Logo can pass extra information to its words, and return information. The procedure (word) is instructed to expect something and give that something a name. The colon is used for this purpose. It passes the information by value and the colon is pronounced as the value of. When the procedure is run with a command such as CHAIR  200, the word :thesize takes the value 200 so when FD :thesize is executed, the interpreter understands FD, the value of 200.

 EDALL ;(to enter the editor mode, then the actual procedure)
 TO CHAIR :thesize
 REPEAT 4 [FD :thesize RT 90]
 FD :thesize
 END
 CS
 REPEAT 9 [CHAIR 50 RT 20 CHAIR 100 WAIT 50 RT 20]

Other notes
Mathematics in Logo uses prefix or Polish notation, like: sum :x :y, product :x :y, difference :x :y, quotient :x :y. Infix is also available.

 help "keyword ;(will bring up a full description of the expression).

Logo allows for recursion, a process where a procedure calls itself.

 to spiral :size
    if  :size > 30 [stop] ; an exit condition
    fd :size rt 15        ; many lines of action
    spiral :size *1.02    ; the tailend recursive call
 end

 spiral 10

Symbolic computing code examples

Filter, map and reduce examples
 ? print filter [?>2] [1 2 3 4]
 3 4
 ? print map [?*?] [1 2 3 4]
 1 4 9 16
 ? print reduce [max ?1 ?2] [1 999 432 654]
 999

 ?

Max can be implemented as
 to max :a :b
 output ifelse :a > :b [:a] [:b]
 end

Define and use a procedure which calculates the average of its numeric arguments
 ? to average [:nums] 2
 > op (apply "sum :nums) / (count :nums)
 > end
 ? print average 1 5
 3
 ? print (average 1 2 3 4 5)
 3
 ? print apply "average [1 2 3 4 5]
 3
 ?

Define and use a procedure to compute plurals
 ? to plural :word
 > if equalp last :word "y [op word bl :word "ies]
 > if equalp last :word "s [op word :word "es]
 > output word :word "s
 > end
 ? print plural "body
 bodies
 ? print map "plural [book body virus]
 books bodies viruses
 ?

Transcribe a sentence into Pig latin example
 ? to pigl :word
 > if punctuationp last :word [op word pigl.real bl :word last :word]
 > op pigl.real :word
 > end
 ? to pigl.real :word
 > if vowelp first :word [op word :word "ay]
 > op pigl.real word bf :word first :word
 > end
 ? to vowelp :letter
 > op memberp :letter [a e i o u]
 > end
 ? to punctuationp :letter
 > op memberp :letter [. , ? !]
 > end
 ? print map "pigl [pig Latin is fun, and hard to master at the same time!]
 igpay atinlay isay unfay, anday ardhay otay astermay atay ethay amesay imetay!
 ?

See also

 MicroWorlds
 StarLogo
 NetLogo

References

External links

UCBLogo Source Code Repository
Experimental Online Logo interpreter (Extended version of former CS61A Programming Project #4. Implements a subset of UCBLogo, lacks turtle graphics.)

Logo programming language family
Free educational software
Educational programming languages
University of California, Berkeley